London Buses route 21 is a Transport for London contracted bus route in London, England. Running between Holloway and Lewisham, it is operated by London Central.

The route is operated by New Routemasters.

History 
In 2018, a Metrodecker EV prototype from Optare was trialed on the route.

In November 2021, the frequency of the service was reduced from 6-8 minutes to 8-10 minutes.

On 4 February 2023, route 21 was re-routed to serve Nag's Head in Holloway instead of Newington Green, partially replacing the daytime route 271, following a successful consultation in early 2022.

Current route
Route 21 operates via these primary locations:
 Lewisham Shopping Centre
 Lewisham station  
 St Johns station 
 New Cross Gate station  
 Old Kent Road
 Bricklayers Arms
 Borough station 
 London Bridge station  
 Bank and Monument stations  
 Moorgate station  
 Moorfields Eye Hospital
 Essex Road railway station 
 Highbury & Islington station    
St Mary Magdalene Church
 Holloway Road station 
 Holloway, Nag's Head

Incident 
On 1 April 2017, a number 21 bus blocked the street in Cornhill as it became stuck after mounting the curb during an attempted three-point turn.

References 

Bus routes in London